An inquisitor was an official (usually with judicial or investigative functions) in an inquisition – an organization or program intended to eliminate heresy and other things contrary to the doctrine or teachings of the Catholic faith. Literally, an inquisitor is one who "searches out" or "inquires" (Latin inquirere < quaerere, 'to seek'). Inquisitors sought out the social networks that people used to spread heresy. There were accounts where the Inquisition could not tell who was a heretic or devout, and they were killed anyway. One of these accounts was Arnaud Amalric at the storming of Béziers. The abbot was recorded as saying “Kill them. For God knows who are his.” This brought up concern about the role the Inquisition was playing  and whether or not it was a truly righteous cause.    

The role of the Inquisitor was further questioned by "The Grand Inquisitor", a chapter by author Dostoyevsky in his novel, "The Brothers Karamazov." In this prose chapter, Christ came back to earth and was imprisoned by the Grand Inquisitor. The Grand Inquisitor argued that Christ could not be free because his work would directly oppose the church, because free will was a burden to humanity. Dostoyevsky ends the chapter by saying that the Roman Empire secretly followed the work of Satan instead of Christ, due to Satan allowing the best form of order for Humankind.  In this story, the Roman Empire used religion as a way to control the average population. This made the Inquisition out to be a war on ideology and free will, as opposed to a suppression of heresy.

Prominent inquisitors
Some of the better-known and notable inquisitors throughout history include:

Peter of Verona (also known as Saint Peter Martyr), whose canonization was the fastest in history
 Pedro de Arbués
 Nicolau Aymerich author of Directorium Inquisitorum
 Stephen of Bourbon
 Arnaut Catalan
 Fabio Chigi (later Pope Alexander VII)
 Diego Deza
 Bernard Gui
 Heinrich Institoris, author of Malleus Maleficarum
 Francisco Jimenez de Cisneros
 Konrad von Marburg
 Sebastien Michaelis
 Giovanni Pietro Carafa (later Pope Paul IV)
 Jacob Sprenger, purported co-author of Malleus Maleficarum
 Tomás de Torquemada
 Martín García Ceniceros
 Hentenius (1540s-1566)
 Vincenza Matilde Testaferrata, female inquisitor

From fiction

See also
 Grand Inquisitor
 Medieval Inquisition
 Spanish Inquisition
 Portuguese Inquisition
 Roman Inquisition
 Mexican Inquisition
 Inquisitorial system, a type of legal system

References

Inquisition
 I